Carlos Latuff (born 30 November 1968) is a Brazilian political cartoonist. His work deals with themes such as  anti-Western sentiment, anti-capitalism, and opposition to U.S. military intervention. He is best known for his images depicting the Israeli–Palestinian conflict and the Arab Spring events.

Latuff's cartoons comparing Israel to Nazism have been accused of being antisemitic by the Simon Wiesenthal Center and by other authorities in the field, especially the cartoons of his which are considered to trivialize the Holocaust. Latuff has dismissed the charges of antisemitism as "a strategy for discrediting criticism of Israel."

Early life
Latuff was born in the neighborhood of São Cristóvão in Rio de Janeiro, Brazil, and is of Lebanese ancestry; in his own words, he has "Arab roots".

History 
Latuff began as a cartoonist for leftist publications in Brazil. After watching a 1997 documentary about the Zapatistas in Mexico, he sent a couple of cartoons to them, and received a positive response. He has stated that after this experience, he decided to start a website and engage in "artistic activism". Graham Fowell, ex-chairman of the Cartoonists' Club of Great Britain, has compared his work to that of Banksy, the English-based graffiti artist.

In 2011, Latuff was contacted by activists in Egypt. Latuff has stated that he was encouraged when he saw some of his cartoons depicted in the January 25 Egyptian protests, a couple of days after he made them. According to Reuters, this helped him become "a hero of the tumultuous Arab Spring with rapid-fire satirical sketches".

Latuff has been arrested at least three times in Brazil for his cartoons about the Brazilian police, whom he has criticized for police brutality.

Published works
Latuff's works have often been self-published on Indymedia websites and private blogs. He is a weekly cartoonist for The Globe Post and some of his cartoons have been featured in magazines such as the Brazilian edition of Mad, Le Monde Diplomatique and the Mondoweiss website. In addition, a few of his works were published on Arab websites and publications such as the Islamic Front for the Iraqi Resistance (JAMI) magazine, the Saudi magazine Character, the Lebanese newspaper Al Akhbar, among others. Additionally, Latuff also contributes to several Middle Eastern newspapers, including Alquds Alarabi, Huna Sotak and the Islamophobia Research and Documentation Project – IRDP. In 2019 a selection of his cartoons was published in the book Drawing Attention to the Israeli-Palestinian Conflict: Political Cartoons by Carlos Latuff.

Themes
A large number of Latuff's cartoons are related to the Israeli–Palestinian conflict, an issue which assumed significance for the cartoonist after a visit to the region in the late 1990s. His cartoons are extremely critical of Israel.

Latuff has created a series of cartoons criticizing United States president George W. Bush, Brazilian president Luiz Inácio Lula da Silva, and British prime minister Tony Blair, among other politicians.

Latuff is critical of US military action in Iraq and Afghanistan. He began to publish his work on the web from the earliest stages of the invasion. According to his narrative, "war is not a video game, and technofetishism is not to be celebrated, but exposed." He has made promotional cartoons for anti-US militancy as well as cartoons alleging US actions have been motivated by the chance of making profit from oil. Among the cartoons, there are also some that portray US soldiers as severely wounded, dead, or paraplegic or as harming Iraqi civilians.

In his comic series Tales of Iraq War he portrays "Juba, the Baghdad sniper", an Iraqi insurgency character claimed to have shot down several dozen US soldiers, as a "superhero". He has also made a caricature of US President George W. Bush laughing over US casualties.

Since the end of 2010, he has been engaged in producing cartoons about the Arab Spring in which he sided with the revolutionaries. After the victory of revolutions in Tunisia, Egypt and Libya his cartoons about these countries have focused on the menace of counter-revolution or Western interference. Some of his cartoons have been displayed in mass demonstrations in Arab countries.

Allegations of antisemitism 

The profile gained by Latuff's cartoons has led to accusations of antisemitism. Adam Levick, a writer for the Jerusalem Center for Public Affairs, alleged that the cartoons contained antisemitism and antisemitic motifs. Ian Black of The Guardian opined in 2008 that Latuff was uninhibited in his utilization of "judeophobic stereotypes in the service of the anti-globalisation movement."

In 2002 the Swiss-based Holocaust survivors organization Aktion Kinder des Holocaust sued the Indymedia of Switzerland on the charge of antisemitism for publishing Latuff's cartoon titled We are all Palestinians series in their website, which depicted a Jewish boy in the Warsaw Ghetto saying: "I am Palestinian." The criminal proceedings were suspended by Swiss court.

In their 2003 Annual Report, the Stephen Roth Institute compared Latuff's cartoons of Ariel Sharon to "the antisemitic caricatures of Philipp Rupprecht in Julius Streicher's Der Stürmer." The SRI also complained over a cartoon showing Argentinian revolutionary Che Guevara in a Palestinian keffiyeh.

In December 2006, Latuff gained the joint-second prize for his cartoon comparing the West Bank barrier with the Nazi concentration camps at the Iranian International Holocaust Cartoon Competition showing an Arab male as an inmate. Latuff's entry was described as "Holocaust inversion," a "motif" of antisemitism, by Manfred Gerstenfeld.

Joel Kotek, a professor at Belgium's Free University of Brussels, in his book Cartoons and Extremism calls Latuff "the contemporary Drumont of the internet." Journalist Édouard Drumont was the founder of the Antisemitic League of France. Eddy Portnoy, in The Forward, reviewing the book in 2008, wrote that Latuff's material is "often terribly obnoxious... but it is a stretch to categorize his cartoons as antisemitic."

British author Dave Rich has described Latuff's cartoons as regularly using anti-Semitic imagery. In 2015, the Middle East Monitor (MEMO) campaign group used one of Latuff's cartoons comparing Israel to Nazi Germany which also made use of a Jewish or Zionist octopus, an anti-semitic trope.

Cartoonist's response 
Latuff, in an interview with the Jewish-American weekly newspaper The Forward in December 2008, responded to charges of antisemitism and the comparisons made between his cartoons and those published in Der Stürmer in Nazi Germany:My cartoons have no focus on the Jews or on Judaism. My focus is Israel as a political entity, as a government, their armed forces being a satellite of U.S. interests in the Middle East, and especially Israeli policies toward the Palestinians. It happens to be Israeli Jews that are the oppressors of Palestinians... My detractors say that the use of the Magen David in my Israel-related cartoons is irrefutable proof of antisemitism; however, it’s not my fault if Israel chose sacred religious motifs as national symbols, such as the Knesset Menorah or the Star of David in killing-machines like F-16 jets.
Latuff also stated that anti-Semitism is real, that anti-Semites like European neo-Nazis, "hijack" the Palestinian cause to bash Israel. To assert, however, that anti-Zionism is anti-Semitic is, in his view, "a well-known tactic of intellectual dishonesty." He said that political cartoonists work by metaphors, and that similarities can be found between the IDF treatment of Palestinians and what Jews experienced under the Nazis. Such comparisons are not created by cartoonists, he said, but can be made by the viewer. He instanced the fact that a Holocaust survivor like Tommy Lapid reacted to the image of a Palestinian woman foraging in the rubble by thinking of his grandmother who was murdered in Auschwitz. The use of cartoons insulting Muslims by depicting Muhammad as a bomber is defended as "freedom of speech", while using the Holocaust in drawings is deplored as "hatred against the Jews".

Latuff was included in Simon Wiesenthal Center's 2012 Top Ten Anti-Israel/Anti-Semitic Slurs list being placed third for depicting Israeli premier  Benjamin Netanyahu squeezing votes out of a dead Arab child. Latuff told Brazil's Opera Mundi  newspaper that he considered the award "a joke worthy of a Woody Allen movie". He also claimed that Zionist lobbying groups try to associate him with well-known extremists and racists in order to disqualify his criticism of the Israeli government. He also said figures such as José Saramago, Desmond Tutu and Jimmy Carter were also accused of being antisemitic, saying that he was "in good company".

Prizes
 Latuff received joint-second prize in the antisemitic parody International Holocaust Cartoon Competition.

Publications
 Drawing attention to the Israeli-Palestinian Conflict: Political Cartoons by Carlos Latuff, 2019, .

See also

 Omaya Joha

References

External links

 Official blog
 Latuff's official page on Twitpic
 Latuff's official page on DeviantArt

1968 births
Living people
Brazilian anti-capitalists
Brazilian artists
Brazilian cartoonists
Brazilian socialists
Brazilian people of Lebanese descent
People from Rio de Janeiro (city)
Anti-Zionism in South America
Left-wing politics in Brazil
Anti-imperialism
Anti-Americanism
Anti-Western sentiment
Anti-British sentiment
Nazi analogies
Controversies in Brazil
Political controversies
Race-related controversies in comics
Palestinian solidarity activists